Café Paradis (English Title: Paradise Cafe) is a 1950 Danish film, directed by Bodil Ipsen and Lau Lauritzen Jr., and written by . The film received the Bodil Award for Best Danish Film, and Ib Schønberg, for what is regarded his finest performance, received the Bodil Award for Best Supporting Actor.

The story illuminates the problems of alcoholism as it follows the lives of two people: one is a common workman (played by Poul Reichhardt) who drinks too much beer, and the other is a company director (played by Ib Schønberg), who believes he just needs "a little one every now and then." They both come to face the consequences of their addictions.

Cast 
 Poul Reichhardt
 Ib Schønberg
 Ingeborg Brams
 Else Højgaard
 Karin Nellemose
 Johannes Meyer
 Jørn Jeppesen
 Inge Hvid-Møller
 Asbjørn Andersen
 Lau Lauritzen Jr.
 Aage Fønss

References

External links 
 
 
 

1950 documentary films
1950 drama films
1950 films
Best Danish Film Bodil Award winners
Danish black-and-white films
Danish documentary films
1950s Danish-language films
Films about alcoholism
Films directed by Bodil Ipsen
Films directed by Lau Lauritzen Jr.
Films scored by Sven Gyldmark